The 1986–87 Boston Celtics season was the 41st season of the Boston Celtics in the National Basketball Association (NBA). The Celtics entered the season as the defending NBA Champions, having defeated the Houston Rockets in the 1986 NBA Finals in six games, winning their sixteenth NBA championship.

In the playoffs, the Celtics swept the Chicago Bulls in the First Round in three games, defeated the Milwaukee Bucks in the Semi-finals in seven games, and the Detroit Pistons in the Conference Finals in seven games to reach the NBA Finals for the fifth time in the 1980s. In the Finals, the Celtics faced off against their long time rival, the Los Angeles Lakers, in their third and final matchup in the NBA Finals in the 1980s. The Celtics would lose in six games to the Lakers, and it marked the last time the Celtics made it to the NBA Finals until 2008. Remarkably, the 1987 NBA Finals was the first playoff series for the Celtics in the Bird era in which they did not have the home court advantage, as they had played 24 consecutive series with the home court advantage starting in 1980.

NBA Draft
Thanks to the 1984 trade of Gerald Henderson and the subsequent fall of the Seattle SuperSonics, at the end of the 1985–86 season the Celtics owned not only the best team in the NBA but also the second pick in the 1986 NBA Draft.  The Celtics drafted Len Bias with the pick and had high hopes for the young Maryland Terrapins star. The hope was that his presence would ensure that the franchise would remain a powerhouse after Bird, McHale, and Parish retired. Unfortunately, Bias died 48 hours after he was drafted, after using cocaine at a party and overdosing.

Unlike the prior year, the Celtics were forced to endure major injuries to several key players including Bill Walton, Kevin McHale and Robert Parish.  With a road record of 20–21, the Celtics were a sub-.500 road team for the first time in the Larry Bird era and the first time since the 1978–79 season.  However, they continued with the previous season's historic dominance at home with a record of 39–2 at Boston Garden.

Regular season

Season standings

Record vs. opponents

Game log

|- align="center" bgcolor="#bbffbb"
| 1 || Fri. Oct. 31 || Washington Bullets  || 120-102 ||Boston Garden ||1-0
|-

|- align="center" bgcolor="edbebf"
| 2 || Sat. Nov. 1 || @ Milwaukee Bucks  || 105-111  ||Milwaukee Arena (MECCA) ||1-1
|- align="center" bgcolor="#bbffbb"
| 3 || Wed. Nov. 5  || Indiana Pacers || 133-102 || Boston Garden || 2-1
|- align="center" bgcolor="#bbffbb"
| 4 || Fri. Nov. 7  || @Washington Bullets || 88-86 || Capital Centre || 3-1
|- align="center" bgcolor="edbebf"
| 5 || Tue. Nov. 11  || @ New Jersey Nets || 110-114 || Brendan Byrne Arena || 3-2
|- align="center" bgcolor="#bbffbb"
| 6 || Wed. Nov. 12  || Milwaukee Bucks || 124-116 || Boston Garden || 4-2
|- align="center" bgcolor="#bbffbb"
| 7 || Fri. Nov. 14  || @ Chicago Bulls || 124-105 || Chicago Stadium ||5-2
|- align="center" bgcolor="#bbffbb"
| 8 || Sat. Nov. 15  || @ Detroit Pistons || 118-111 || Pontiac Silverdome || 6-2
|- align="center" bgcolor="#bbffbb"
| 9 || Wed. Nov. 19  || Atlanta Hawks || 111-107 || Boston Garden || 7-2
|- align="center" bgcolor="#bbffbb"
| 10 || Fri. Nov. 21 ||  Golden State Warriors || 135-120 || Boston Garden || 8-2
|- align="center" bgcolor="edbebf"
| 11 || Sat. Nov. 22  || @ Atlanta Hawks || 96-97 || The Omni || 8-3
|- align="center" bgcolor="edbebf"
| 12 || Tue. Nov. 25 || @ Philadelphia 76ers || 100-102 || The Spectrum || 8-4
|- align="center" bgcolor="#bbffbb"
| 13 || Wed. Nov. 26  || New York Knicks || 101-90 || Boston Garden || 9-4
|- align="center" bgcolor="#bbffbb"
| 14 || Fri. Nov. 28  || San Antonio Spurs  || 111-96 || Boston Garden || 10-4
|-

|- align="center" bgcolor="edbebf"
| 15 || Tue. Dec. 2  || Washington Bullets  || 109-117 || Hartford Civic Center || 10-5
|- align="center" bgcolor="#bbffbb"
| 16 || Wed. Dec. 3  || Denver Nuggets  || 119-113 || Boston Garden || 11-5
|- align="center" bgcolor="#bbffbb"
| 17 || Fri. Dec. 5  || Philadelphia 76ers  || 108-106 || Boston Garden || 12-5
|- align="center" bgcolor="edbebf"
| 18 || Sat. Dec. 6  || @ Cleveland Cavaliers  || 86-88 || Richfield Coliseum || 12-6
|- align="center" bgcolor="#bbffbb"
| 19 || Wed. Dec. 10  ||  New Jersey Nets  || 108-98 || Boston Garden || 13-6
|- align="center" bgcolor="edbebf"
| 20 || Fri. Dec. 12  || Los Angeles Lakers  || 110-117 || Boston Garden || 13-7
|- align="center" bgcolor="#bbffbb"
| 21 || Sat. Dec. 13  || @ Washington Bullets || 105-98 || Capital Centre || 14-7
|- align="center" bgcolor="#bbffbb"
| 22 || Tue. Dec. 16  || @ New York Knicks || 107-96 || Madison Square Garden || 15-7
|- align="center" bgcolor="#bbffbb"
| 23 || Wed. Dec. 17  || Indiana Pacers || 113-101 || Boston Garden || 16-7
|- align="center" bgcolor="edbebf"
| 24 || Fri. Dec. 19  || @ Philadelphia 76ers || 100-122 || The Spectrum || 16-8
|- align="center" bgcolor="edbebf"
| 25 || Sat. Dec. 20 || @ Milwaukee Bucks || 100-120 || Milwaukee Arena (MECCA) || 16-9
|- align="center" bgcolor="#bbffbb"
| 26 || Fri. Dec. 26  || @ Phoenix Suns || 122-112 || Arizona Veterans Memorial Coliseum || 17-9
|- align="center" bgcolor="#bbffbb"
| 27 || Sat. Dec. 27  || @ Los Angeles Clippers || 114-101 || L.A. Sports Arena || 18-9
|- align="center" bgcolor="#bbffbb"
| 28 || Mon. Dec. 29  || @ Sacramento Kings || 119-102 || ARCO Arena I || 19-9
|- align="center" bgcolor="#bbffbb"
| 29 || Tue. Dec. 30  || @ Seattle SuperSonics || 104-102 || Seattle Center Coliseum || 20-9
|-

|- align="center" bgcolor="#bbffbb"
| 30 || Fri. Jan. 2  ||Chicago Bulls || 113-99 || Boston Garden || 21-9
|- align="center" bgcolor="#bbffbb"
| 31 || Wed. Jan. 7  || Milwaukee Bucks || 119-92 || Boston Garden || 22-9
|- align="center" bgcolor="#bbffbb"
| 32 || Fri. Jan. 9  || Sacramento Kings || 109-99 || Boston Garden || 23-9
|- align="center" bgcolor="edbebf"
| 33 || Sat. Jan. 10  || @ Detroit Pistons || 101-118 || Pontiac Silverdome || 23-10
|- align="center" bgcolor="#bbffbb"
| 34 || Tue. Jan. 13  || @ New Jersey Nets || 123-117 || Brendan Byrne Arena || 24-10
|- align="center" bgcolor="#bbffbb"
| 35 || Wed. Jan. 14  || Dallas Mavericks || 117-108 || Boston Garden || 25-10
|- align="center" bgcolor="#bbffbb"
| 36 || Fri. Jan. 16  || Cleveland Cavaliers || 133-128 (OT) || Boston Garden || 26-10
|- align="center" bgcolor="#bbffbb"
| 37 || Sun. Jan. 18  || Houston Rockets || 122-99 || Boston Garden || 27-10
|- align="center" bgcolor="edbebf"
| 38 || Mon. Jan. 19  || @ New York Knicks || 109-111 || Madison Square Garden || 27-11
|- align="center" bgcolor="#bbffbb"
| 39 || Wed. Jan. 21  || Indiana Pacers || 130-100 || Boston Garden || 28-11
|- align="center" bgcolor="#bbffbb"
| 40 || Fri. Jan. 23 || Atlanta Hawks || 126-106 || Boston Garden || 29-11
|- align="center" bgcolor="#bbffbb"
| 41 || Sun. Jan. 25  || Philadelphia 76ers || 111-96 || Boston Garden || 30-11
|- align="center" bgcolor="#bbffbb"
| 42 || Tue. Jan. 27  || @ Chicago Bulls || 105-97 || Chicago Stadium || 31-11
|- align="center" bgcolor="#bbffbb"
| 43 || Wed. Jan. 28  || Chicago Bulls || 132-103 || Boston Garden || 32-11
|- align="center" bgcolor="#bbffbb"
| 44 || Fri. Jan. 30  || @ Indiana Pacers || 100-94 || Market Square Arena || 33-11
|-

|- align="center" bgcolor="edbebf"
| 45 || Tue. Feb. 3  || @ Atlanta Hawks || 123-126 (OT) || The Omni || 33-12
|- align="center" bgcolor="#bbffbb"
| 46 || Wed. Feb. 4  || Cleveland Cavaliers || 104-102 || Boston Garden || 34-12
|- align="center" bgcolor="#bbffbb"
| 47 || Tue. Feb. 10  || @ Denver Nuggets || 119-105 || McNichols Sports Arena || 35-12
|- align="center" bgcolor="#bbffbb"
| 48 || Thu. Feb. 12  || @ Golden State Warriors || 134-112 || Oakland Coliseum || 36-12
|- align="center" bgcolor="#bbffbb"
| 49 ||Fri. Feb. 13  || @ Portland Trail Blazers || 131-116 || Memorial Coliseum || 37-12
|- align="center" bgcolor="edbebf"
| 50 ||Sun. Feb. 15  || @ Los Angeles Lakers || 103-106 || The Forum || 37-13
|- align="center" bgcolor="edbebf"
| 51 ||Mon. Feb. 16  || @ Utah Jazz || 89-109 || Salt Palace || 37-14
|- align="center" bgcolor="#bbffbb"
| 52 ||Wed. Feb. 18  || @ Dallas Mavericks || 113-96 || Reunion Arena || 38-14
|- align="center" bgcolor="#bbffbb"
| 53 ||Thu. Feb. 19  || @ Houston Rockets || 99-92 || The Summit || 39-14
|- align="center" bgcolor="#bbffbb"
| 54 ||Sat. Feb. 21  || @ San Antonio Spurs || 121-113 || HemisFair Arena || 40-14
|- align="center" bgcolor="#bbffbb"
| 55 ||Mon. Feb. 23  || New Jersey Nets || 116-103 || Hartford Civic Center || 41-14
|- align="center" bgcolor="#bbffbb"
| 56  ||Wed. Feb. 25  || Portland Trail Blazers || 122-116 || Boston Garden || 42-14
|- align="center" bgcolor="edbebf"
| 57  ||Fri. Feb. 27  || @ Atlanta Hawks || 105-115 || The Omni || 42-15
|-

|- align="center" bgcolor="#bbffbb"
| 58  ||Sun. Mar. 1  || Detroit Pistons || 112-102 || Boston Garden || 43-15
|- align="center" bgcolor="#bbffbb"
| 59  ||Wed. Mar. 4  || Utah Jazz || 123-105 || Boston Garden || 44-15
|- align="center" bgcolor="#bbffbb"
| 60  ||Fri. Mar. 6  || Los Angeles Clippers || 132-111 || Boston Garden || 45-15
|- align="center" bgcolor="edbebf"
| 61  ||Sun. Mar. 8  || @ Detroit Pistons || 119-122 (OT) || Pontiac Silverdome ||45-16
|- align="center" bgcolor="#bbffbb"
| 62  ||Wed. Mar. 11  || Phoenix Suns || 118-109 || Boston Garden ||46-16
|- align="center" bgcolor="edbebf"
| 63  ||Fri. Mar. 13  || @ Indiana Pacers || 109-116 || Market Square Arena ||46-17
|- align="center" bgcolor="#bbffbb"
| 64  ||Sun. Mar. 15  || New York Knicks || 113-104 || Boston Garden ||47-17
|- align="center" bgcolor="edbebf"
| 65  ||Tue. Mar. 17  || @ Milwaukee Bucks || 115-123 || Milwaukee Arena (MECCA) ||47-18
|- align="center" bgcolor="#bbffbb"
| 66  ||Wed. Mar. 18  || Milwaukee Bucks || 120-102 || Boston Garden ||48-18
|- align="center" bgcolor="#bbffbb"
| 67  ||Fri. Mar. 20  || Seattle SuperSonics || 112-108 || Boston Garden ||49-18
|- align="center" bgcolor="#bbffbb"
| 68  ||Sun. Mar. 22  || New Jersey Nets || 116-104 || Boston Garden ||50-18
|- align="center" bgcolor="#bbffbb"
| 69  ||Tue. Mar. 24  || Cleveland Cavaliers || 111-88 || Hartford Civic Center ||51-18
|- align="center" bgcolor="edbebf"
| 70  ||Thu. Mar. 26  || @ Washington Bullets || 103-106 || Capital Centre ||51-19
|- align="center" bgcolor="#bbffbb"
| 71  ||Fri. Mar. 27  || @ Chicago Bulls || 111-106 || Chicago Stadium ||52-19
|- align="center" bgcolor="#bbffbb"
| 72  ||Sun. Mar. 29  || Philadelphia 76ers || 118-100 || Boston Garden ||53-19
|- align="center" bgcolor="edbebf"
| 73  ||Tue. Mar. 31 || @ New York Knicks || 120-128 || Madison Square Garden ||53-20
|-

|- align="center" bgcolor="#bbffbb"
| 74  ||Wed. Apr. 1  || Washington Bullets || 103-86 || Boston Garden ||54-20
|- align="center" bgcolor="#bbffbb"
| 75  ||Fri. Apr. 3 || Detroit Pistons || 119-115 (OT) || Boston Garden ||55-20
|- align="center" bgcolor="edbebf"
| 76  ||Sun. Apr. 5  || @ Philadelphia 76ers || 104-106 (OT) || The Spectrum ||55-21
|- align="center" bgcolor="edbebf"
| 77  ||Tue. Apr. 7  || @ Cleveland Cavaliers || 83-107 || Richfield Coliseum ||55-22
|- align="center" bgcolor="edbebf"
| 78  ||Fri. Apr. 10 || @ New Jersey Nets || 108-117 || Brendan Byrne Arena ||55-23
|- align="center" bgcolor="#bbffbb"
| 79  ||Sun. Apr. 12  || New York Knicks || 119-107 || Boston Garden ||56-23
|- align="center" bgcolor="#bbffbb"
| 80  ||Wed. Apr. 15  || @ Indiana Pacers || 108-85 || Market Square Arena ||57-23
|- align="center" bgcolor="#bbffbb"
| 81  ||Fri. Apr. 17  || Chicago Bulls || 108-105 || Boston Garden ||58-23
|- align="center" bgcolor="#bbffbb"
| 82  ||Sun. Apr. 19  || Atlanta Hawks || 118-107 || Boston Garden ||59-23
|-

|-
| 1986-87 Schedule

Roster

Player stats
Note: GP= Games played; REB= Rebounds; AST= Assists; STL = Steals; BLK = Blocks; PTS = Points; AVG = Scoring Average

Playoffs

|- align="center" bgcolor="#ccffcc"
| 1
| April 23
| Chicago
| W 108–104
| Kevin McHale (21)
| Robert Parish (11)
| Larry Bird (13)
| Boston Garden14,890
| 1–0
|- align="center" bgcolor="#ccffcc"
| 2
| April 26
| Chicago
| W 105–96
| Larry Bird (29)
| McHale, Parish (10)
| Larry Bird (8)
| Boston Garden14,890
| 2–0
|- align="center" bgcolor="#ccffcc"
| 3
| April 28
| @ Chicago
| W 105–94
| Larry Bird (32)
| Larry Bird (14)
| Dennis Johnson (10)
| Chicago Stadium18,122
| 3–0
|-

|- align="center" bgcolor="#ccffcc"
| 1
| May 5
| Milwaukee
| W 111–98
| Larry Bird (40)
| Robert Parish (12)
| Bird, Johnson (7)
| Boston Garden14,890
| 1–0
|- align="center" bgcolor="#ccffcc"
| 2
| May 6
| Milwaukee
| W 126–124
| Bird, Ainge (30)
| Larry Bird (10)
| Dennis Johnson (10)
| Boston Garden14,890
| 2–0
|- align="center" bgcolor="#ffcccc"
| 3
| May 8
| @ Milwaukee
| L 121–126 (OT)
| Dennis Johnson (32)
| Robert Parish (16)
| Dennis Johnson (14)
| MECCA Arena11,052
| 2–1
|- align="center" bgcolor="#ccffcc"
| 4
| May 10
| @ Milwaukee
| W 138–137 (2OT)
| Larry Bird (42)
| Kevin McHale (11)
| Dennis Johnson (12)
| MECCA Arena11,052
| 3–1
|- align="center" bgcolor="#ffcccc"
| 5
| May 13
| Milwaukee
| L 124–129
| Robert Parish (30)
| Robert Parish (16)
| Larry Bird (12)
| Boston Garden14,890
| 3–2
|- align="center" bgcolor="#ffcccc"
| 6
| May 15
| @ Milwaukee
| L 111–121
| Dennis Johnson (25)
| Kevin McHale (16)
| Dennis Johnson (14)
| MECCA Arena11,052
| 3–3
|- align="center" bgcolor="#ccffcc"
| 7
| May 17
| Milwaukee
| W 119–113
| Larry Bird (31)
| Robert Parish (19)
| Dennis Johnson (10)
| Boston Garden14,890
| 4–3
|-

|- align="center" bgcolor="#ccffcc"
| 1
| May 19
| Detroit
| W 104–91
| Robert Parish (31)
| Larry Bird (16)
| Larry Bird (11)
| Boston Garden14,890
| 1–0
|- align="center" bgcolor="#ccffcc"
| 2
| May 21
| Detroit
| W 110–101
| Larry Bird (31)
| Bird, Parish (9)
| Larry Bird (12)
| Boston Garden14,890
| 2–0
|- align="center" bgcolor="#ffcccc"
| 3
| May 23
| @ Detroit
| L 104–122
| Sam Vincent (18)
| Larry Bird (11)
| Dennis Johnson (8)
| Pontiac Silverdome23,525
| 2–1
|- align="center" bgcolor="#ffcccc"
| 4
| May 24
| @ Detroit
| L 119–145
| Sam Vincent (18)
| Kevin McHale (9)
| Sam Vincent (7)
| Pontiac Silverdome27,387
| 2–2
|- align="center" bgcolor="#ccffcc"
| 5
| May 26
| Detroit
| W 108–107
| Larry Bird (36)
| Larry Bird (12)
| Larry Bird (9)
| Boston Garden14,890
| 3–2
|- align="center" bgcolor="#ffcccc"
| 6
| May 28
| @ Detroit
| L 105–113
| Larry Bird (35)
| Kevin McHale (12)
| Dennis Johnson (11)
| Pontiac Silverdome28,383
| 3–3
|- align="center" bgcolor="#ccffcc"
| 7
| May 30
| Detroit
| W 117–114
| Larry Bird (37)
| Robert Parish (11)
| Dennis Johnson (11)
| Boston Garden14,890
| 4–3
|-

|- align="center" bgcolor="#ffcccc"
| 1
| June 2
| @ L.A. Lakers
| L 113–126
| Larry Bird (32)
| Larry Bird (7)
| Dennis Johnson (13)
| The Forum17,505
| 0–1
|- align="center" bgcolor="#ffcccc"
| 2
| June 4
| @ L.A. Lakers
| L 122–141
| Larry Bird (23)
| Robert Parish (14)
| Dennis Johnson (9)
| The Forum17,505
| 0–2
|- align="center" bgcolor="#ccffcc"
| 3
| June 7
| L.A. Lakers
| W 109–103
| Larry Bird (30)
| Larry Bird (12)
| Ainge, McHale (5)
| Boston Garden14,890
| 1–2
|- align="center" bgcolor="#ffcccc"
| 4
| June 9
| L.A. Lakers
| L 106–107
| Kevin McHale (25)
| Kevin McHale (13)
| Dennis Johnson (14)
| Boston Garden14,890
| 1–3
|- align="center" bgcolor="#ccffcc"
| 5
| June 11
| L.A. Lakers
| W 123–108
| Dennis Johnson (25)
| Kevin McHale (14)
| Dennis Johnson (11)
| Boston Garden14,890
| 2–3
|- align="center" bgcolor="#ffcccc"
| 6
| June 14
| @ L.A. Lakers
| L 93–106
| Dennis Johnson (33)
| Johnson, McHale (10)
| Danny Ainge (6)
| The Forum17,505
| 2–4
|-

Award winners
 Larry Bird, All-NBA First Team
 Kevin McHale, All-NBA First Team
 Kevin McHale, All-NBA Defensive First Team

References

 Celtics on Database Basketball
 Celtics on Basketball Reference

Boston Celtics seasons
Boston Celtics
Eastern Conference (NBA) championship seasons
Boston Celtics
Boston Celtics
Celtics
Celtics